Ugo Calà (9 August 1904 – 10 July 1983) was an Italian chess player.

Biography
In the 1920s Ugo Calà participated in two team matches against the Syracuse team and ranking in 2nd place in the second regional chess tournament in Palermo. Then, after graduating in engineering, he moved permanently to Rome. Ugo Calà participated in the chess tournaments of Foligno (1924) and in 1925 he won the title of Rome chess champion. His career was from that moment studded with numerous successes and affirmations both nationally and internationally. In 1931, in Milan chess tournament Ugo Calà achieved promotion to National Master title.

Ugo Calà played for Italy in the Chess Olympiads:
 In 1952, at fourth board in the 10th Chess Olympiad in Helsinki (+2, =3, -6),
 In 1954, at first reserve board in the 11th Chess Olympiad in Amsterdam (+2, =9, -3).

References

External links

Ugo Calà chess games at 365chess.com

1904 births
1983 deaths
Sportspeople from Catania
Italian chess players
Chess Olympiad competitors
20th-century chess players